This is a list of temples in Bishnupur, which are located in the Bishnupur district of West Bengal, India. The town is famous for the unique terracotta temples made from the locally available laterite stones. The Malla rulers were Vaishnavites and built the famous terracotta temples during the 17th and 18th centuries at this place.

See also 
Mallabhum temples

Bishnupur
 
Bishnupur
Bishnupur
Hindu temples
Temples in Bishnupur
Lists of tourist attractions in West Bengal